John Colonel "Ikey" Karel, Jr., (February 28, 1873December 3, 1938) was an American politician, judge, lawyer, college football player, and coach.

Early life and athletic career
Karel was born on February 28, 1873, in Schuyler, Nebraska. He moved with his family to Wisconsin in 1874 and attended high school in Kewaunee, Wisconsin, before graduating from the University of Wisconsin Law School in 1895 and moving to Milwaukee. While at University of Wisconsin, Karel was a football player and a baseball player for the Wisconsin Badgers. Karel also coached the football team at Lawrence College in Appleton, Wisconsin, in 1896.

Political career
Karel was a member of the Wisconsin State Assembly in 1901 and was a Democrat. Additionally, he was twice an unsuccessful candidate for Governor of Wisconsin, losing to incumbent Francis E. McGovern in 1912 and to Emanuel L. Philipp in 1914. In 1916, he was a delegate to the Democratic National Convention. From 1907 until his death in 1938, Karel served as Milwaukee County Court judge. Karel died in Milwaukee, Wisconsin.

Head coaching record

References

External links
 The Political Graveyard

1873 births
1938 deaths
19th-century players of American football
Lawrence Vikings football coaches
Democratic Party members of the Wisconsin State Assembly
People from Schuyler, Nebraska
People from Kewaunee, Wisconsin
Players of American football from Nebraska
Players of American football from Wisconsin
Politicians from Milwaukee
University of Wisconsin Law School alumni
Wisconsin Badgers baseball players
Wisconsin Badgers football players
Wisconsin lawyers
Wisconsin state court judges